South Mesopotamian Arabic is a variety of Mesopotamian Arabic spoken in southern Iraq (Basra, Maysan, Dhi Qar, and Wasit). It is also known as El-Lahja Al-Janubia which means the dialect of Southern Iraqis. The variety differs distinctly from the rest dialects of Iraq. It has a strong Aramaic influence. the most noticeable about this variety is the pronunciation of the sounds /g/, /tʃ/, /ʒ/ and /p/.

See also 

 Varieties of Arabic
 Mesopotamian Arabic

References 

Gilit Mesopotamian Arabic